Ana Buenaventura Mocoroa (died 8 February 2001), also known as Titina Mocoroa, was an Argentine physicist.  She is known for her contributions in experimental physics and her dedication to improving the teaching of her discipline.

Biography
Ana Buenaventura Mocoroa graduated with a licentiate in Physics in 1955 and later, in 1966, she obtained the degree of Doctor in Physics, both at the National University of La Plata (UNLP). She was among the first women in Argentina to obtain the latter title.

She served as a physics teacher in various faculties of UNLP and other institutions. She was a teacher at the Faculty of Exact Science, occupied the Physics I and Physics II chairs between 1979 and 1981, and Physics III in 1984. Together with her husband Marco Antonio Poggio (1917–1996), she taught at the UNLP Faculty of Medicine and the Escuela Naval Militar, and they co-wrote a general physics manual. She also taught modern physics.

At the Faculty of Humanities and Education Sciences, she was appointed a member of the Interfaculties Commission as a representative of the Faculty of Exact Sciences, with the aim of restructuring teacher study plans. The group was led by Dr. Lía Zervino, Nieves Baade, and engineer María Isabel Cotignola. Together they made numerous presentations to physics teaching congresses and meetings, where they discussed both classroom innovations and new content organization proposals. Together with her team, in 1997 she presented a curricular proposal for physics teaching in engineering programs.

She was director of the doctoral thesis of La Plata physicist Roberto Mercader.

Recognition
The National Technological University – La Plata Regional Faculty (UTN-FRLP) considered Titina Mocoroa a valuable teacher. In 1995, she was appointed consultant professor for a 3-year term. In 1998, UTN-FRLP named its new library "Biblioteca Prof. Dra. Ana B. Mocoroa" in her honor.

Titina Mocoroa was recognized for her qualities as a teacher, particularly clarity and dynamism. Physicist Moisés Silbert remembers her as a great motivator:

The astronomer Zulema González credits Titina Mocoroa for the support to find her true vocation:

Argentine physicist Adriana Calvo de Laborde mentioned Ana Mocoroa in her testimony at the Trial of the Juntas in 1985, referring to having asked for help in reference to Inés Ortega and her son born in captivity, who were disappeared under the civil–military dictatorship.

References

2001 deaths
20th-century Argentine physicists
Argentine women physicists
National University of La Plata alumni
Academic staff of the National University of La Plata
Year of birth missing